Gar Tsangpo, also called Gartang or Gar River, is a headwater of the Indus River in the Ngari Prefecture, Tibet, China. It merges with other headwater, Sênggê Zangbo, near the village of Tashigang to form the Indus River. The combined river flows in the same valley and in the same direction as Gar Tsangpo. Thus by physical geography, Gar Tsangpo is the "Indus River". The Tibetans however regard Sênggê Zangbo as the main Indus River, and treat Gar Tsangpo as a tributary.

Gartok, the former administrative headquarters of Ngari is in the Gar Valley. The present headquarters, under PRC administration, is at Shiquanhe in the Sênggê Zangbo valley, close to the point of confluence of the two rivers.

Course 

The sources of Gartang are on the southwestern slopes of the Kailas Range (Gangdise Shan). From there, the river flows northwest in the Gar Valley, the tectonic valley between the Kailas Range and the Ladakh Range. The slope of the valley is extremely gentle, only about 2 metres per kilometre.

The point of confluence is near the town of Tashigang (Zhaxigang). After the confluence, the combined river, regarded as the Indus River, flows in the same direction as Gartang. For this reason, western explorers have traditionally regarded Gartang as the main source of the Indus River. However, the Tibetans regard Sengge Zangbo as the main Indus River and the Gartang as its tributary.

The Gartang river drains an area of 6,060 km2.

History 
The two locations together have been called "Gartok" and served as the administrative headquarters of Ngari (West Tibet) during the Ganden Phodrang administration of Tibet. The Lhasa-appointed administrator, called Garpön, used to stay at Gar Yarsa during the summemr months, and at Gar Gunsa during the winter. After the Chinese annexation of Tibet in 1950, the headquarters of Ngari was moved to a new town of Shiquanhe on the Sengge Zangbo river.

References

Bibliography 
 

Rivers of Tibet
Tributaries of the Indus River